Astroscopus guttatus (northern stargazer) is a fish that can reach lengths of  and is found on the Atlantic shores between the states of North Carolina and New York in the United States. Stargazers have a flat forehead with a lot of body mass up front near the mouth.

Description
The northern stargazer has a blackish brown body with white spots that are of the same size all over its head and back. It has three dark horizontal stripes on its (white) tail. The mouth of the stargazer faces up so that it can ambush prey while hiding in the sandy bottoms of coastal bodies of water. The top of the stargazer has electric organs in the orbitae which can generate and transmit an electric shock. The electric apparatus is composed of two organs, which form two vertical columns roughly oval in horizontal section, and placed behind and somewhat under each eye. It is composed of about 200 thin layers of electric tissue.

Ecology
Northern stargazers live primarily along the eastern seaboard of the United States. They bury themselves in the sand and wait for prey (usually smaller fish) to happen by. Their eyes are situated on top of the head and poke up through the sand, hence the name stargazer. The stargazer's scientific name is Astroscopus guttatus where Astroscopus means "one who aims at the stars" and guttatus translating into "speckled" – referring to the white spots on the fish's back.

Life cycle
Stargazers lay small, transparent eggs on the bottoms of bays. These eggs float to the surface after they are released. After this they swim to the bottom and grow into adults.

Taxonomy
The northern stargazer was first described by Charles Conrad Abbott in 1860.

References

External links

 

Uranoscopidae
Fish of the Eastern United States
Fish described in 1860
Taxa named by Charles Conrad Abbott